Pretrež is a settlement on the left bank of the Ložnica River in the Municipality of Slovenska Bistrica in northeastern Slovenia. The area is part of the traditional region of Styria. It is now included with the rest of the municipality in the Drava Statistical Region.

References

External links
Pretrež at Geopedia

Populated places in the Municipality of Slovenska Bistrica